This list of countries which border two or more oceans includes both sovereign states and dependencies, provided the same contiguous territory borders on more than one of the five named oceans, the Pacific, Atlantic, Indian, Southern, and Arctic. Countries which border on multiple oceans because of discontiguous regions are excluded here but included in the list of transcontinental countries. Countries bordering on just one of the five oceans are not included, no matter how many of its marginal seas they touch.

List

Notes

See also 
 Borders of the oceans
 Boundaries between the continents of Earth
 Sea to Sea (disambiguation)
 Transcontinental railroad
 World Ocean
 Bioceanic principle

References 

Bordering two or more oceans
Bordering two or more oceans
Countries
Countries
Eurasia
Africa
Americas
Oceania
Antarctica